Cowling is a village, electoral division and civil parish in the Craven district of North Yorkshire, England. It is situated on the borders with the adjacent counties of West Yorkshire, and Lancashire.

Historically part of the West Riding of Yorkshire, it is a village consisting of 2,000 to 3,000 residents, measured at 2,355 in the Census 2011. The village is expanding due to new housing being built in the middle of the village. Cowling includes a variety of services to support the community including a village hall, primary school, shops, a pub, a restaurant, a pizza take-away, and hairdressers.  A gala is held in Cowling every year.

History
The village is Saxon in origin and is recorded in the Domesday Book as 'Collinge'. The name means Coll's people or tribe. At the time of the Norman conquest the main landowner was Gamel who had very large land holdings in Yorkshire. His name survives in Gamsgill on the northern edge of the village.

Originally the village comprised three separate hamlets namely Ickornshaw, Middleton, Gill and Cowling Hill. It was only following the construction of the main Keighley to Colne road (A6068) and the building of large mills alongside the road that what is now regarded as the main village was constructed providing terraced cottage homes for the mill workers. The older parts of the village faded in importance and as a result the parish church and primary school are located on what appears to be the outskirts of the village between Ickornshaw and Middleton, the centre of the village having moved since their construction.

The mills continued to operate and to provide the main source of local employment until the end of the 20th century but are now all closed down and their sites largely redeveloped for housing and the village hall. The village is now very much a dormitory village for those working in the surrounding towns of West Yorkshire and East Lancashire. It is the base for a licensed community radio station, Drystone Radio.

Famous people from Cowling
Philip Snowden, who served as Chancellor of the Exchequer in the first two Labour governments, was born in the village; when awarded a viscountcy in 1931, his full title was "Viscount Snowden, of Ickornshaw in the West Riding of Yorkshire". In the early 1930s, Snowden spoke in the local dialect of Cowling on a 78rpm gramophone produced by the Yorkshire Dialect Society. Snowden's ashes were scattered on Ickornshaw Moor and there is a memorial cairn to Snowden to mark the fact that he "died in the love of his native land".

Gallery

References

External links

Cowling News, local newsletter
Cowling Village Hall, facebook
Harlequin Bistro, Cowling

Villages in North Yorkshire
Civil parishes in North Yorkshire
Craven District